Phonogram Incorporated was started in 1970 as a successor to Philips Phonographic Industries, a unit of the Grammophon-Philips Group (GPG), a joint venture of Philips N.V. of the Netherlands and Siemens A.G. of Germany.

Phonogram was the name of a parent company that owned and or distributed many different record labels. Phonogram was never a record label as such, but a holding company for labels which included Philips, Fontana, Vertigo and Mercury and many other licensed labels.

History

In 1972 Grammophon-Philips Group was reorganized as The PolyGram Group. Following PolyGram's acquisition of Mercury in the United States, the corporate name was changed from Mercury Record Productions, Inc., to Phonogram, Inc. In the U.S. Phonogram artists were generally released on Mercury Records, but the label is independent from its U.K. counterpart. By 1982, Mercury and all other PolyGram owned labels including, RSO, Polydor, Total Experience and Casablanca carried the following wording "Manufactured And Marketed by PolyGram Records" with the PolyGram Records logo.

In the United Kingdom, Phonogram was the holding company for Philips Records, which was established in 1953 and also launched the Fontana label in 1958. As well as producing their own recordings many of which became U.K. hits, Philips/Fontana licensed the rights from Columbia Records (U.S.) to release and distribute their product from 1953 until the end of 1964. After that time, Columbia U.S. set up their own marketing and production unit in the UK in Theobalds Road, London, having acquired Oriole Records and its record-pressing plant that had prospered in manufacturing discs for U.K. budget labels including Embassy, sold through Woolworths. U.S. Columbia was unable to use the "Columbia" trademark outside the United States and Canada as it had already been copyrighted overseas by EMI. Therefore, U.S. Columbia product was released in most territories on the CBS record label.

In 1977 Frank Zappa negotiated a distribution agreement with Phonogram for his Zappa Records label. Due to legal pressure from Zappa's previous distributor Warner Bros. Records, Zappa and Phonogram were forced to shelve a planned 4-LP box set called Läther (pronounced "Leather".) Phonogram did distribute 3 Zappa albums in the US and Canada, but the agreement ended in 1980. According to Zappa, this was because a Phonogram executive objected to the lyrics of a Zappa single titled I Don't Wanna Get Drafted. Phonogram president Robert Sherwood disputed Zappa's version of the story, insisting that they did not want to release a single without the support of a full-length album.

Releases in Europe were issued by Vertigo and Philips and carried the "Marketed by Phonogram" wording with the Phonogram logo. Phonogram also licensed recordings from small U.S. record labels for European release. Among these were Avco, Sire, Janus, Westbound, All Platinum, and Chess.

De-establishment

In 1997, all PolyGram units still using the Phonogram name were renamed Mercury Records. By that time, Mercury had become PolyGram's flagship label. PolyGram continued until 1998, when the company was purchased by Seagram and merged with Universal Music Group. Philips Records UK and Phonogram UK still have their own websites at WIX.

See also
 Lists of record labels

References

American record labels
British record labels
Record labels established in 1970
Joint ventures
Philips
Pop record labels